Kashmir Life is a weekly news magazine with an associated news website, published from Srinagar, the capital city of Jammu and Kashmir.

History
Kashmir Life was founded by late Jawahara Shawl in March 2009. The magazine is now owned by Shawl's brother-in-law, Masood Hussain. He was appointed as Managing editor of Kashmir life in April, 2017. Hussain is a veteran journalist  and its Managing editor, who formerly worked with the Economic Times, which he left in 2015 after 17 years.
The daily publication of Kashmir Life was halted for over 1 year after the Govt of India abrogated Article 370 in Jammu and Kashmir (state) and a complete internet shutdown was observed for over 18 months.

References

External links 

2009 establishments in Jammu and Kashmir
English-language magazines published in India
News magazines published in India
Weekly magazines published in India
 Magazines established in 2009